Neudorf (German for "new village") may refer to:

Places

Austria
Neudorf bei Staatz, in the district of Mistelbach, Lower Austria
Wiener Neudorf, in the district of Mödling, Lower Austria
Neudorf bei Parndorf, in Burgenland
Neudorf bei Passail, in Styria

Canada
Neudorf, Saskatchewan, a town located in the south east corner of the Canadian province of Saskatchewan

Czech Republic
Nová Ves (Louny District), German name Neudorf, a village and municipality in Louny District in the Ústí nad Labem Region
Nová Ves (Sokolov District), German name Neudorf, a village and municipality in Sokolov District in the Karlovy Vary Region
Převýšov, German name Neudorf, a village and municipality located about 4 km west of Chlumec nad Cidlinou

France
Neudorf (Strasbourg), a district in the south of Strasbourg
Neudorf, German name of Village-Neuf, a municipality in the Haut-Rhin department

Germany
Neudorf (Wächtersbach), a village on the Kinzig in Wächtersbach, Hesse
Neudorf, Saxony-Anhalt, a town in the district of Harz in Saxony-Anhalt
Neudorf, Sehmatal, a district of the municipality Sehmatal in Saxony, Germany
Neudorf, a locality of Amorbach in northern Bavaria
Neudorf, a locality of Pegnitz in northern Bavaria
Graben-Neudorf, a town in the district of Karlsruhe in Baden-Württemberg
Neudorf-Bornstein, a municipality in Schleswig-Holstein
Kreba-Neudorf, a district of the municipality Kreba in eastern Saxony
Neudorf/Spree, a district of the municipality Malschwitz in eastern Saxony
Neudorf, a village of the municipality Neschwitz in eastern Saxony
Neudorf, a village of the municipality Königswartha in eastern Saxony
Neudorf, a district of the municipality Zeithain in eastern Saxony

Luxembourg
Neudorf-Weimershof, a neighbourhood within the city of Luxembourg

Poland
Ciecierzyn, Opole Voivodeship, German name Neudorf, a village in the administrative district of Gmina Byczyna, Kluczbork County, Opole Voivodeship
Łozice, Koszalin County, German name Neudorf, a village in the administrative district of Gmina Bobolice, Koszalin County, West Pomeranian Voivodeship
Nowa Wieś, Grudziądz County, German name Neudorf, a village in the administrative district of Gmina Grudziądz, Grudziądz County, Kuyavian-Pomeranian Voivodeship
Nowa Wieś, Gmina Golub-Dobrzyń, German name Neudorf, a village in the administrative district of Gmina Golub-Dobrzyń, Golub-Dobrzyń County, Kuyavian-Pomeranian Voivodeship
Nowa Wieś, Gmina Pleszew, German name Neudorf, a village in the administrative district of Gmina Pleszew, Pleszew County, Greater Poland Voivodeship
Nowa Wieś, Iława County, German name Neudorf, a village in the administrative district of Gmina Iława, Iława County, Warmian-Masurian Voivodeshi
Nowa Wieś, Kartuzy County, German name Neudorf, a village in the administrative district of Gmina Stężyca, Kartuzy County, Pomeranian Voivodeshi
Nowa Wieś, Kościan County, German name Neudorf, a village in the administrative district of Gmina Śmigiel, Kościan County, Greater Poland Voivodeship
Nowa Wieś Kłodzka, a village in the Lower Silesian Voivodeship formerly known as Neudorf
Nowa Wieś Kwidzyńska, German name Neudorf, a village in the administrative district of Gmina Kwidzyn, Kwidzyn County, Pomeranian Voivodeship
Nowa Wieś Legnicka, German name Neudorf, a village in the administrative district of Gmina Legnickie Pole, Legnica County, Lower Silesian Voivodeship
Nowa Wieś Lubińska, German name Neudorf, a village in the administrative district of Gmina Polkowice, Polkowice County, Lower Silesian Voivodeship
Nowa Wieś, Międzyrzecz County, German name Neudorf, a village in the administrative district of Gmina Bledzew, Międzyrzecz County, Lubusz Voivodeship
Nowinki, Nowy Dwór Gdański County, German name Neudorf, a village in the administrative district of Gmina Nowy Dwór Gdański, Nowy Dwór Gdański County, Pomeranian Voivodeship
Nowa Wieś Oleska, German name Neudorf, a village in the administrative district of Gmina Gorzów Śląski, Olesno County, Opole Voivodeship
Nowa Wieś Prudnicka, German name Neudorf, a village in the administrative district of Gmina Biała, Prudnik County, Opole Voivodeship
Nowa Wieś, Wągrowiec County, German name Neudorf, a settlement in the administrative district of Gmina Wągrowiec, Wągrowiec County, Greater Poland Voivodeship
Nowa Wieś, Wschowa County, German name Neudorf, a village in the administrative district of Gmina Wschowa, Wschowa County, Lubusz Voivodeship
Polska Nowa Wieś, former German name Polnisch Neudorf
Prosinko, German name Neudorf,  a village in the administrative district of Gmina Czaplinek, Drawsko County, West Pomeranian Voivodeship
Siemiradz, Lubusz Voivodeship, former German name Neudorf, a settlement in the administrative district of Gmina Trzebiel, Żary County, Lubusz Voivodeship

New Zealand
Neudorf, a former German settlement in Tasman District

Romania
Neudorf, Arad (Temesújfalu), a village in Zăbrani Commune, Arad County
Ohaba, German name Neudorf, a commune located in Alba County
Certeze, German name Neudorf, Satu Mare County
Neudorf, the German name for Ciceu-Corabia village, Ciceu-Mihăiești Commune, Bistriţa-Năsăud County
Neudorf, the German name for Nou Săsesc village, Laslea Commune, Sibiu County
Neudorf, the German name for Nou village, Roșia, Sibiu Commune, Sibiu County

Russia
Noidorf (Нойдорф), industrial and business park in the special economic zone in Strelna near Saint Petersburg

Serbia
Neudorf, the former name of the village currently named Bačko Novo Selo

Slovenia
Nova Vas, Preddvor, German name Neudorf, in the Upper Carniola region
Nova Vas pri Mokricah, German name Neudorf, in the Municipality of Brežice
Nova Vas, Ivančna Gorica, German name Neudorf, a village in the hills south of Višnja Gora in the Municipality of Ivančna Gorica
Zavrh, Litija, German name Neudorf, a settlement north of Dole in the Municipality of Litija

Switzerland
Neudorf, Lucerne, in the Canton of Lucerne

Ukraine
Nove Selo, Drohobych Raion, named Neudorf from 1783 to 1938

People with the surname
Darryl Neudorf (born 1964), Canadian musician, record producer and audio engineer
Nathan Neudorf (fl. from 2019), Canadian politician from Alberta
Tara (von Neudorf) (born 1974), Romanian artist

See also
Neuendorf (disambiguation)